Mercedes Calderón Martínez (born 1 September 1965) is a former female volleyball player from Cuba, who was a member of the Women's National Team that won the gold medal at the 1992 Summer Olympics in Barcelona, Spain.

References
 databaseOlympics

1965 births
Living people
Cuban women's volleyball players
Volleyball players at the 1992 Summer Olympics
Olympic volleyball players of Cuba
Olympic gold medalists for Cuba
Olympic medalists in volleyball
Medalists at the 1992 Summer Olympics
Pan American Games medalists in volleyball
Pan American Games gold medalists for Cuba
Medalists at the 1991 Pan American Games
Medalists at the 1995 Pan American Games
20th-century Cuban women
20th-century Cuban people
21st-century Cuban women